The 21st Brigade was an infantry brigade formation of the British Army.

First World War
It was assigned to the 7th Division and later to 30th Division, serving on the Western Front during World War I.

Order of battle
The composition of the brigade was:
2nd Battalion, Bedfordshire Regiment (transferred to 89th Brigade 20 December 1915)
2nd Battalion, Alexandra, Princess of Wales's Own (Yorkshire Regiment) (left May 1918)
2nd Battalion, Royal Scots Fusiliers (transferred to 90th Brigade 20 December 1915)
2nd Battalion, The Duke of Edinburgh's (Wiltshire Regiment) (left May 1918)
18th (Service) Battalion, King's Regiment (Liverpool) (joined from 89th Brigade 20 December 1915, rejoined 89th Brigade February 1918)
19th (Service) Battalion, Manchester Regiment (4th City) (joined from 90th Brigade 20 December 1915 disbanded February 1918)
17th (Service) Battalion, Manchester Regiment (2nd City) (joined February 1918, left as cadre June 1918)
2/5th (Service) Battalion, Lincolnshire Regiment (joined May 1918, left June 1918)
21st Machine Gun Company (''joined 8 March 1916, moved to 30th Battalion Machine Gun Corps (M.G.C.) 1 March 1918
21st Trench Mortar Battery	formed by 5 July 1916

On reorganisation in July 1918:

7th (South Irish Horse) Battalion, The Royal Irish Regiment
1/6th Battalion, Cheshire Regiment
2/23rd (County of London) Battalion, London Regiment
21st Trench Mortar Battery

Second World War
The brigade was reformed in the Second World War. The brigade Headquarters were formed in the Sudan on 24 July 1940, commanded by Brigadier J.C.O. Marriott and, as in the First World War, consisting of three Regular Army battalions. However, with the arrival of the 5th Indian Infantry Division, which at the time consisted only of two brigades, the brigade was transferred to the Indian Army establishment and subsequently, on 12 October 1940, redesignated as the 29th Indian Infantry Brigade and the battalions were posted to the other two brigades of 5th Indian Division, the 2nd West Yorkshire Regiment to the 9th Indian Infantry Brigade and 1st Essex Regiment to 10th Indian Infantry Brigade.

Order of battle
 2nd Battalion, West Yorkshire Regiment
 1st Battalion, Essex Regiment
 1st Battalion, Worcestershire Regiment

References

Infantry brigades of the British Army in World War I
Infantry brigades of the British Army in World War II